Takhuit was the Great Royal Wife of Psamtik II. She dates to the Twenty-sixth Dynasty of Egypt.

She was the wife of Psamtik II and the mother of Pharaoh Apries and the God's Wife of Amun Ankhnesneferibre. Takhuit is known to be the wife of King Psamtik II, because their daughter Ankhnesneferibre is recorded as a King's Sister and to be born of Takhuit.

Burial
Takhuit was buried in Athribis. Her tomb was discovered in 1950. A large sarcophagus and a heart scarab were discovered in her tomb.

References

6th-century BC Egyptian women
Queens consort of the Twenty-sixth Dynasty of Egypt
6th-century BC Egyptian people
Great Royal Wives